Zoologia is a peer-reviewed open access scientific journal covering zoological taxonomy, phylogeny, biogeography and more. It was established in 1982 by the Sociedade Brasileira de Zoologia. It is published by Pensoft Publishers. It was formerly called "Revista Brasileira de Zoologia" but changed name to Zoologia in 2009.

References

External links
 
 

Creative Commons Attribution-licensed journals
English-language journals
Open access journals
Publications established in 1982
Zoology journals
Pensoft Publishers academic journals